The Zonguldak Subregion (Turkish: Zonguldak Alt Bölgesi) (TR81) is a statistical subregion in Turkey.

Provinces 

 Zonguldak Province (TR811)
 Karabük Province (TR812)
 Bartın Province (TR813)

See also 

 NUTS of Turkey

External links 
 TURKSTAT

Sources 
 ESPON Database

Statistical subregions of Turkey